Uncollected Stars is an anthology of 16 science fiction themed short stories collected from other publications. It was published in 1986 by Avon Books.

Contents
"Introduction" by Piers Anthony
"Time Enough" by Lewis Padgett
"The Soul-Empty Ones" by Walter M. Miller, Jr.
"Defender of the Faith" by Alfred Coppel
"All of You" by James V. McConnell
"The Holes" by Michael Shaara
"Beast in the House" by Michael Shaara
"Little Boy" by Jerome Bixby
"Unwillingly to School" by Pauline Ashwell
"Brother Robot" by Henry Slesar
"The Risk Profession" by Donald E. Westlake
"The Stuff" by Henry Slesar
"Arcturus Times Three" by Jack Sharkey
"They Are Not Robbed" by Richard M. McKenna
"The Creatures of Man" by Verge Foray
"Only Yesterday" by Ted White
"An Agent in Place" by Laurence M. Janifer
"Afterword" by Barry N. Malzberg

1986 books
Science fiction anthologies
Avon (publisher) books